The Hayes Mansion is a historic mansion estate in the Edenvale neighborhood of San Jose, California. The mansion currently operates as a hotel resort and is currently known as Hayes Mansion San Jose, Curio Collection by Hilton. The hotel has been a member of Historic Hotels of America, the official program of the National Trust for Historic Preservation, since 2019.

Originally the home of the Hayes family, the mansion is regarded as one of the best examples of late 19th-century Mission Revival architecture in the Santa Clara Valley. It is a California Historical Landmark and listed on the National Register of Historic Places.

History

Architect George Page was commissioned in 1903 by Mary Chynoweth, widow of Anson Hayes and wife of San Jose attorney Thomas Chynoweth, to build a home to replace the Hayes family's wooden English Baroque mansion, which had burned to the ground in 1899.  Intended to provide a triple residence for the Chynoweths and growing families of Mary's two sons (Everis A. Hayes and Jay Orly Hayes), the home's design incorporated the latest fire safety features of the day.

Early on, the property was self-sufficient, with its own power plant, a post office, railroad station, carriage stop, lodgings for 40 ranch hands, and a chapel.  The family grew fruits and vegetables and raised its own livestock. Everis A. Hayes and Jay Hayes went on to help develop the Santa Clara Valley fruit industry and became the publishers of the San Jose Mercury.  Three U.S. Presidents visited the mansion during their prominence.

The family sold the property during the 1950s, after which the building remained vacant for some time then became dilapidated.  Purchased by the City of San Jose during the 1990s, the property was renovated and expanded to its present state. The building now contains  of meeting space and 214 guest rooms and is surrounded by a  park.

Architecture
The  Mediterranean villa features exotic woods, imported marble and ornate stained glass windows.  Constructed in the shape of a Maltese Cross, its long center section contains an 18-foot (5.45 m) wide solarium connecting the north and south wings.

A loggia connects the east with the west. Walls are stucco coated double brick. Fire-safety features include fire hose cabinets connected to water tanks on the third floor and a kitchen located in a separate building connected to the mansion by a glass and marble conservatory.

References

External links

Official website of Dolce Hayes Mansion
Hayes family

Houses completed in 1905
Buildings and structures in San Jose, California
Mediterranean Revival architecture in California
Spanish Colonial Revival architecture in California
National Register of Historic Places in Santa Clara County, California
Houses on the National Register of Historic Places in California
Houses in Santa Clara County, California
Hotels in San Jose
California Historical Landmarks
Tourist attractions in the San Francisco Bay Area
1905 establishments in California
Historic Hotels of America